Jaitsar is a town in the Sri Ganganagar district of Rajasthan, 

Jaitsar Central State Farm was established in 1964. It is the second largest farm of Asia. Indian cabinet also approved 200 mW solar plant on 400 hectare of CSF, Jaitsar . Jaitsar panchayat is also known as 1Gb-A Village whose census was 7297 in 2011.
Jaitsar is a designated sub tehsil.

Jaitsar is a designated sub tehsil.

Culture 
Jaitsar town contains a wide cultural diversity. Most of the people from the main city are local merchants and the people from surrounded rural area are farmers. The city has a auroras, traditional Punjabi culture with some native Rajasthani influence. Kashmiri Pandits (Kashmiri migrants) have been living in the city and nearby villages (3LC (A); 4LC) since 1950 speak their native language Poonchi.

Tourist attractions 

 Historical Gurudwara Buddha Johad. A large gurudwara, which is 14 km from Jaitsar & 55 km from Ganganagar in the south-west. This is a place where Bhai Sukha Singh and Mehtab Singh brought the head of Massa Rangarh (guilty of sacrilege of the Amritsar Golden Temple) and hung it on a tree on 11 August 1740.
 Jaitsar-Sardargarh Central State Farm

Sports 
Jaitsar Stadium

Jaitsar Stadium is located at Government Senior secondary school. Hundreds of people come here on daily basis for the physical training for the recruitment processes.

There is infrastructure for the practice of sports such as cricket, football, badminton, volleyball and basketball.

Railway stations 
Jaitsar Station connects it to major stations such as Sriganganagar, Suratgarh, Jaipur etc.

Sarupsar Junction is a Jaitsar Area Railway Junction which connects it to Vijaynagar, Anoopgarh etc.

Bugia Halt: a Jaitsar Area Railway Station which is constructed for people of nearby rural Area

References

External links 
 https://www.google.co.in/maps/place/Rajasthan+335702/@29.3349895,73.6309659,13z/
 

Villages in Jodhpur district